Edward Lyttelton (23 July 1855 – 26 January 1942) was an English schoolmaster, cleric and sportsman from the Lyttelton family who was headmaster of Eton College from 1905 to 1916. During his early years he played first-class cricket for Cambridge University and Middlesex.

Early life and family
Lyttelton was born at Hagley, Worcestershire on 23 July 1855 to George Lyttelton, 4th Baron Lyttelton and his first wife, Mary (née Glynne; 1813–1857), sister-in-law of William Gladstone.

His was a sporting family, with five of his seven brothers playing first-class cricket: Alfred, Charles, George, Arthur and Robert.

Lyttelton was educated at Eton College followed by Trinity College, Cambridge, where he became a member and club librarian of the University Pitt Club.

Sporting career

A right-handed middle order batsman, Lyttelton had his best season in 1878 when he amassed 779 runs at 29.96, helping Middlesex to finish as joint Champions. He scored his only first-class hundred that year, an innings of 113 which he made while playing for Middlesex against the touring Australian side, at Lord's. His century stood out as it occurred in the fourth innings, was double the next highest score in the match by either team (56) and was made despite Middlesex being bowled out for just 185. According to Wisden, Lyttelton's last 76 runs came in only 74 minutes. In the same season, Lyttelton took the only wicket of his first-class career, Yorkshire opening batsman George Ulyett, who also batted for England. He dismissed him, caught and bowled, in a match for Cambridge University against Yorkshire. Aside from Cambridge University and Middlesex he also represented the Gentlemen cricket team, I Zingari, Marylebone Cricket Club and the South of England cricket team.

Lyttelton's only full football international came in a 7–2 defeat by Scotland on 2 March 1878. Another significant achievement in the sport was playing in the 1876 FA Cup Final with the Old Etonians F.C., as a defender, which they lost to the Wanderers on a replay. When picked for England he had been representing Cambridge University.

Teaching career and marriage 
From 1880 to 1882, Lyttelton worked as an assistant master at Wellington College, and then at Eton College. He attended Cuddesdon College in 1883–1884 in preparation for his ordination in 1886.

In 1888 Lyttelton married Caroline Amy West, daughter of the Very Reverend John West, dean of St Patrick's Cathedral, Dublin. They went on to have two daughters.

He was appointed master of Haileybury College in 1890, where he remained until 1905 when he became headmaster of Eton College. There he introduced reforms allowing boys to enter the school without knowledge of Greek, and once there to avoid classics entirely in favour of mathematics, modern languages, science or history.

His Christian principles made his position difficult after the outbreak of the First World War, especially following the reception to his sermon at St Margaret's, Westminster, in March 1915, in which he argued that the whole German nation should not be condemned and that any peace settlement should be generous. This led to a public storm of protest, and following a personal spiritual crisis Lyttelton resigned his post in 1916.

Clerical career and final years 
Lyttelton gave up teaching and in 1917 became curate to the Reverend Richard "Dick" Sheppard at St Martin-in-the-Fields, following which he worked as rector of the small parish of Sidestrand in Norfolk from 1918 to 1920. In 1920 he became dean of Whitelands College, Chelsea, a teacher training college for women, acting both as lecturer on the Bible and as chaplain. He retired in 1929.

He was appointed to the position of honorary canon at Norwich in 1931–1941 and during the last year of his life honorary canon at Lincoln. He died at his home, the Old Palace, Lincoln, on 26 January 1942.

Publications

 Studies in the Sermon on the Mount
 The Gospel of St. Mark with notes
 What Are We Fighting For?
 Character and Religion

References

Further reading 
Edward Lyttelton: An Appreciation (1943) by Lyttelton's brother-in-law, Cyril Alington.

1855 births
1942 deaths
English cricketers
Free Foresters cricketers
Cambridge University cricketers
Middlesex cricketers
Gentlemen cricketers
Head Masters of Eton College
People educated at Eton College
English footballers
England international footballers
Cambridge University A.F.C. players
Old Etonians F.C. players
20th-century English Anglican priests
I Zingari cricketers
Edward Lyttelton
Alumni of Trinity College, Cambridge
Marylebone Cricket Club cricketers
North v South cricketers
Gentlemen of England cricketers
Association football defenders
FA Cup Final players
Younger sons of barons